"Wine, women, and song" is a hendiatris that endorses hedonistic lifestyles or behaviors. A more modern form of the idea is often expressed as "sex and drugs and rock 'n' roll", a phrase popularized by British singer Ian Dury in his song of the same title.

Linguistic variations
Similar tripartite mottoes have existed for a long time in many languages, for example:

 also more modern as 
 (wine, duduk, women)

Colombian Spanish:  (Women, music and drink)
Not all hendiatris including women are positive: in  instead suggest three dangers rather than pleasures, and  offers the three essentials of quite another culture.

Roman inscriptions mention , such as the ambivalent:

The following poem mentions similar ideas, using four concepts rather than three:
 a popular Ghazal by Hafez (1325–1389):
"Two sweethearts,
Two flasks of old wine,
A book of verse
And a cosy corner in the garden."

Omar Khayyam addressed the trio in 1120 in his Rubaiyat, verse XII. For him singing was replaced by a book, but he acknowledged its importance for others. 
A book, a woman, and a flask of wine:
The three make heaven for me; it may be thine
Is some sour place of singing cold and bare —
But then, I never said thy heaven was mine.
As translated by Richard Le Gallienne (1897)

Among rural Arabs in the days before Muhammed, free women "joined in the music of the family or tribal festivities with their instruments". It was a time of the "badawī Arab". A secular people then, for them "love, wine, gambling, hunting, the pleasure of song and romance ... wit and wisdom" were all important.

Possible origins
The English couplet "Who loves not woman, wine, and song / Remains a fool his whole life long" appears in print as early as 1837, translated from German verse attributed to Martin Luther.  John Addington Symonds used the phrase "Wine, Women and Song" as the title for his 1884 book of translations of medieval Latin students' songs. 

The phrase in German is apparently older than in English. Symonds and the anonymous 1837 writer both provide the German text, attributing it to Luther. The attribution to Luther has been questioned, however, and the earliest known reference in German is to a folksong first printed in 1602.   Bartlett's Familiar Quotations cites Johann Heinrich Voss (1751–1826) as a likely source, but any use by him would have to be a later use of the phrase.

The waltz "Wine, Women and Song" (Wein, Weib und Gesang) is Op. 333 (1869) of Johann Strauss II.

The lines Deutsche Frauen, deutsche Treue, / Deutscher Wein, und deutscher Sang (German women, German loyalty, / German wine, and German song) are found in the second verse of Das Lied der Deutschen, the third verse of which is the German national anthem.

In popular culture
 Amber Moore, protagonist of the 2017 Netflix original movie A Christmas Prince, uses the phrase "wine, women, and song" to describe the hedonistic lifestyle of the Prince of Aldovia.
 The single "Sex & Drugs & Rock & Roll" by Ian Dury, mentioned above, popularized the modern English-language form of the phrase.
 The British poet and mystic Aleister Crowley, in his work Energized Enthusiasm, suggests that "wine, women, and song" may be utilised towards the development of genius in the individual or the attainment of mystical states.
 The musical trio Wine, Women and Song consists of award-winning singer/songwriters Gretchen Peters, Suzy Bogguss, and Matraca Berg.
 AC/DC quotes the motto in the title song of their album, High Voltage (1976).
 In The Beatles' 1964 film A Hard Day's Night, the phrase is uttered by road manager Norm, in reference to Ringo, who has escaped from the studio to go gallivanting after tiring of being teased by his bandmates: "God knows what you've unleashed on the unsuspecting South. It'll be wine, women, and song all the way with Ringo when he gets the taste for it."
 In a wagon scene in Calvin and Hobbes, Calvin asks Hobbes if he thinks the secret to happiness is "money, cars and women" or "just money and cars".
 Science fiction series Babylon 5 episode "Born to the Purple" reveals that the password to the hedonistic ambassador Londo Mollari's "Purple Files" (i.e., blackmail material on other houses of the Centauri Republic) is "Wine, Women, Song".
 American jam band Umphrey's McGee uses a variation of the phrase in the song "Women, Wine, and Song" on their 2006 album Safety in Numbers.
 "Wine, Women an' Song" is the name of the fifth song on Come an' Get It by Whitesnake
 The song "I'm a Member of the Midnight Crew" by William Jerome and Jean Schwartz contains the verse, "I always spend my evening where there's women, wine and song."
 The Bee Gees' song "Wine and Women" starts with the sentence "wine and women and song will only make me sad". It was released as a single in 1965 in Australia and was their first top 20 on the local charts and ever in their career.
Swedish hard rock band Talisman featuring onetime Journey frontman Jeff Scott Soto had a song called "Women, Whiskey and Songs" on their self titled 1990 debut album.
 American rock band Harvey Danger (best known for their 1997 song "Flagpole Sitta") include a song titled "Wine, Women and Song" as the first track of their 2005 album Little by Little...
 The 2012 song Rest of My Life by Ludacris, featuring Usher and David Guetta, features the verse "Women, weed and alcohol".
 The 1993 album by guitarist Adrian Legg titled Wine, Women & Waltz utilizes a variant of the phrase.
 In Disney's 1996 animated film: The Hunchback of Notre Dame, gargoyle Hugo mentions the phrase about the event: The Feast of Fools.
 During the 1990s and 2000s, a Latin poem of unknown origin has been written on the packs of Classic, a Serbian brand of cigarette:

Omne mundi trinum,
mulier, tabacum, vinum,
et qui curat de pluribus,
maximus est asinus!

References

Phrases
Hedonism
Sex and drugs